Square One: Michael Jackson is a 2019 investigative documentary directed by Danny Wu. It focuses on the 1993 case in which Michael Jackson was accused of molesting a 13-year-old boy. Through interviews with people closest to the case, the film makes a case for Jackson's innocence. The interviews showcase statements from trial witnesses, Jackson's nephew, and legal assistant to the prosecutor in 1993.

Synopsis
Square One is an independent investigative documentary that examines the original child sexual abuse allegations by Evan Chandler and his son, 13-year-old Jordan Chandler, against pop star Michael Jackson. Evan Chandler initially asked for $20 million in exchange for not accusing Jackson publicly, but later was willing to accept $1 million. After Jackson refused to pay this sum, on August 17, 1993, Chandler took his son to psychiatrist Mathis Abrams, and Jordan told Abrams that Jackson had molested him. Abrams reported the allegations to the Los Angeles County Department of Children and Family Services, and the Los Angeles Police Department initiated an investigation shortly afterward. In September, Jordan Chandler filed a lawsuit through his parents.

The film explains how, after a failed attempt to postpone the civil trial until the criminal case was resolved, which would have been necessary for Jackson to protect his rights for a fair criminal trial, on January 25, 1994, Jackson agreed to pay $15,331,250 to settle the Chandlers' civil lawsuit. That agreement ended the civil case but not the criminal investigation. It went on until September 21, 1994, when the district attorneys announced that they declined to file charges against Jackson because Jordan was unwilling to testify. They also revealed the boy only informed them of that decision on July 6, 1994, many months after the civil settlement. The district attorneys did not explain why they did not charge Jackson while Jordan was still willing to testify.
 
The film features interviews with Jackson's nephew Taj Jackson, three women who were on the 2003 witness list in People v. Jackson, and short-lived legal secretary to Barry Rothman, Geraldine Hughes, and journalist Charles Thomson. The film makes a case for Jackson's innocence, portraying him as a victim of tabloid journalism.

Release
Square One was first released at TCL Chinese Theater on September 28, 2019, with people close to Jackson and others in attendance. On October 5, 2019, the film premiered in London as well as launched on YouTube. In early November 2019, Danny Wu embarked on a multi-city tour in China, premiering the film in Beijing, Zhengzhou, Shenzhen, Kumming, Wunan, Shanghai, and Wu's birthplace of Chengdu. The film had its European premiere in Amsterdam on January 18, 2020. The European premiere was covered by multiple outlets including Algemeen Dagblad, RTL Boulevard, SBS6 Shownieuws, De Telegraaf, Trouw, and Algemeen Nederlands Persbureau.

Square One was made available in an enhanced version on Amazon Prime Video on May 7, 2020, in the US and the UK and worldwide on June 12.

Reception

Josiah Teal from Film Threat said of the documentary, "I found this film very insightful, opening new perspectives on the entire legacy of Michael Jackson." UK Film Review gave the documentary 4/4 stars, stating, "It seems that there have been several counter-arguments raised against the revelations found in Leaving Neverland, but Wu's film manages to stand tallest amongst them all."

See also
1993 child sexual abuse accusations against Michael Jackson
Leaving Neverland
Michael Jackson: Chase the Truth
Neverland Firsthand: Investigating the Michael Jackson Documentary

References

External links
 
 
 
 Square One on Top Documentary Films

2019 documentary films
2019 films
Canadian documentary films
Chinese documentary films
American documentary films
British documentary films
Documentary films about child abuse
Documentary films about pedophilia
English-language Canadian films
Films about child sexual abuse
Works about the Michael Jackson sexual abuse allegations
Documentary films about Michael Jackson
2010s Canadian films
2010s American films
2010s British films